Abdul Rahman Manu (died 29 March 1957) was an Indo-Fijian businessman politician. He served as a nominated member of the Legislative Council from 1956 until his death in 1957.

Biography
Born in Fiji, Manu owned a business and sugar cane farm in Lautoka District.

He was one of the founding members and president of the Maunatul Islam Association, an organisation representing Muslims who originally came to Fiji as indentured labourers from Kerala in South India. He was also an active member of the Society for the Prevention of Cruelty to Animals in Lautoka.

Following the 1956 elections, he was nominated as one of the Indo-Fijian members of the Legislative Council. Following his death the following year, A. H. Sahu Khan was nominated as his replacement.

References 

Fijian farmers
20th-century Fijian businesspeople
Members of the Legislative Council of Fiji
Fijian Muslims
Malayali people
Politicians from Lautoka
1957 deaths